The Eastern League Pitcher of the Year Award is an annual award given to the best pitcher in Minor League Baseball's Eastern League based on their regular-season performance as voted on by league managers. Broadcasters, Minor League Baseball executives, and members of the media have previously voted as well. Though the league was established in 1938, the award was not created until 1985. After the cancellation of the 2020 season, the league was known as the Double-A Northeast in 2021 before reverting to the Eastern League name in 2022.

From 1962 to 1984, pitchers were eligible to win the Eastern League Most Valuable Player Award (MVP) as no award was designated for pitchers. Three pitchers won the MVP Award: Frank Bertaina (1964), Tom Fisher (1966), and Mark Davis (1980). One pitcher has also won the league's Top MLB Prospect Award (formerly the Rookie of the Year Award): Juan Acevedo (1994), who won both awards in the same season.

Four players from the Binghamton Rumble Ponies, Bowie Baysox, and Portland Sea Dogs have been selected for the Pitcher of the Year Award, more than any other teams in the league, followed by the Akron RubberDucks and New Haven Ravens (3); the Albany-Colonie Yankees, Erie SeaWolves, Harrisburg Senators, New Hampshire Fisher Cats, and Trenton Thunder (2); and the Altoona Curve, Glens Falls Tigers, Hagerstown Suns, Hartford Yard Goats, Nashua Pirates, New Britain Rock Cats, Reading Fightin Phils, Richmond Flying Squirrels, Vermont Reds, and Williamsport Bills (1).

Five players from the Baltimore Orioles Major League Baseball (MLB) organization have won the award, more than any other, followed by the Boston Red Sox and New York Mets organizations (4); the Cleveland Guardians, Colorado Rockies, Detroit Tigers, and New York Yankees organizations (3); the Pittsburgh Pirates, Seattle Mariners, Toronto Blue Jays, and Washington Nationals organizations (2); and the Cincinnati Reds, Miami Marlins, Minnesota Twins, Philadelphia Phillies, and San Francisco Giants organizations (1).

Winners

Wins by team

Active Eastern League teams appear in bold.

Wins by organization

Active Eastern League–Major League Baseball affiliations appear in bold.

Notes

References
Specific

General

Awards established in 1985
Minor league baseball trophies and awards
Pitcher